Afroedura donveae, also known commonly as the Iona flat gecko, is a species of lizard in the family Gekkonidae. The species is endemic to Angola.

References

donveae
Reptiles of Angola
Reptiles described in 2021
Taxa named by William Roy Branch
Taxa named by Andreas Schmitz
Taxa named by Werner Conradie